John Henry Hemming  (born 1935) is a historian, explorer, and expert on the Incas and indigenous peoples of the Amazon basin.

Early life and education
Hemming, was born in Vancouver on the 5th of January, 1935. His father, Henry Harold Hemming, who had served in the First World War, likewise foresaw the Second, and wanted his son to be born in North America. So he sent John's mother, Alice Hemming, a journalist, on a cruise through the Panama Canal that ended in British Columbia. John and his sister Louisa were brought back to London when he was two months old. He was educated in the United Kingdom at Eton College, in Canada at McGill University, and read history at Oxford where he obtained a Doctor of Letters degree and became an honorary fellow of Magdalen College.

Career

In 1961, with fellow Oxford graduates Richard Mason and Kit Lambert (who later managed The Who), he was part of the Iriri River Expedition into unexplored country in central Brazil. The Brazilian mapping agency, IBGE, sent a three-man survey team to help map these unknown forests and rivers and gave the Expedition permission to name features it found. However, after four months, an unknown indigenous people found the group's trail, laid an ambush, and killed Richard Mason with arrows and clubs. Mason was the last Englishman ever to be killed by a totally unknown and uncontacted tribe. His body was carried out and buried in the British cemetery in Rio de Janeiro. The tribe was contacted in 1973, and was called Panará: Hemming visited them in 1998 and wrote about this in The Times.

His first book, The Conquest of the Incas, was published in 1970 and has ever since remained in print with two revisions. Because no new documents have been discovered, it is often regarded as the definitive work on the Spanish conquistadors' conquest of Peru. This book won the Robert Pitman Literary Prize and the Christopher Award in New York. Hemming had spent the year 1960 travelling to every part of Peru, was for years chairman of the Anglo-Peruvian Society, and has been awarded Peru's two highest civilian honours: El Sol del Peru ('The Sun of Peru', South America's oldest order of chivalry) and the Grand Cross of the Orden al Merito Publico (Order of Merit). He has also written, with the American photographer Edward Ranney, an account of Inca architecture of Peru, Monuments of the Incas, reissued in a revised edition in 2010.  Among those whom he inspired and befriended is Vince Lee, a fellow Andean explorer and writer.

His experience on the Iriri River expedition led to a heightened interest in Brazilian indigenous peoples. On various expeditions he visited 45 tribes throughout Brazil – four of them (Surui, Parakana, Asurini and Galera Nambikwara) at the time that Brazilian teams made the first-ever face-to-face contact. Over the following 26 years he completed a three-volume history of the indigenous peoples and exploration of the Brazilian Amazonia: Red Gold (1978), which covers the period of 1500–1760; Amazon Frontier (1985), covering the period of 1760–1910; and Die If You Must (2004), which describes their changes during the 20th century. The three volumes add up to over 2,100 pages.

In 1975, John Hemming became director and secretary of the Royal Geographical Society, a post he held until 1996. The society changed substantially during those 21 years: Its membership more than doubled, finances went from deficits to surplus, and lectures expanded from about 20 per year to involve 450 speakers in a series of Monday-night events in London and at branch offices. Expedition training was introduced with the successful Expedition Advisory Centre (run by Nigel Winser and Shane Winser), the Victorian premises beside Hyde Park were restored, and academic geographers of the Institute of British Geographers merged into the society. Research flourished through a series of projects in Wahiba Sands (Oman), Mount Mulu (Sarawak), Karakoram (Pakistan), Kimberley (Australia), Kora National Park (Kenya), Mkomazi (Tanzania) and Badia desert (Jordan) – of which Hemming was co-chairman from 1992–2004. He personally led the Maracá Rainforest Project in Brazil (1987–88) which, with 200 scientists and scientific technicians, became the largest research project in Amazonia organised by any European country – in partnership with Brazilian researchers from INPA (Amazon Research Institute) and [SEMA environment agency.  Hemming was awarded the RGS's Founder's Medal in recognition of his work on the Maracá project, as well as the Brazilian Ordem do Cruzeiro do Sul (Order of the Southern Cross) and medals from the Royal Scottish Geographical Society and the Boston Museum of Science (Bradford Washburn Medal).

John Hemming was or is trustee of many charities, including being one of the founders of Survival International, ten years on the board of The British Council, twelve years at the John Ellerman Foundation, Lepra (leprosy), Earthwatch, The Rainforest Foundation, Gilchrist Educational Trust, Global Diversity Foundation, The Hakluyt Society, the Amazon Charitable Trust, Anglo-Peruvian Society and the Anglo-Brazilian Society.

Aside from his involvement in exploration and Latin America, since 1963 he has worked for the Hemming Group Ltd, setting up and running one of the UK's foremost exhibition-organising companies, Brintex Ltd, before becoming chairman until 2015 of this family business, which also publishes trade titles including The MJ (Municipal Journal)'.

In April 2008 his book, Tree of Rivers: The Story of the Amazon, was published by Thames and Hudson. It was described by Hugh Thomson in the Daily Telegraph as a book that "will stand as the definitive single-volume work on the subject." Another notable book was Naturalists in Paradise. Wallace, Bates and Spruce in the Amazon (2015).

Personal life

In 1979, John Hemming married Susan (Sukie) Babington Smith, daughter of Michael Babington Smith and granddaughter of Sir Henry Babington Smith. She worked for many years in The National Trust, became Director of Development and then Director of Corporate Affairs at the British Museum, and on retirement a trustee of English Heritage.  She is the great-granddaughter of 9th Earl of Elgin on her father's side and the great-great-granddaughter of the 4th Earl of Clanwilliam on her mother's side. They have two children: publisher Beatrice (born 1981) and writer Henry Hemming.

Honours
In the 1994 New Year Honours, Hemming was appointed a Companion of the Order of St Michael and St George (CMG) by the British government. In August 2018, he was awarded the President's Medal of the British Academy "for his work in the field of the colonial history and ethnography of Brazil and Peru, and the promotion of the protection of endangered societies".

Bibliography
 (1970) Conquest of the Incas, London: Pan MacMillan
 (1973) Tribes of the Amazon Basin, Oxford: Oxford University Press
 (1978) The Search for El Dorado, London: Phoenix Books
 (1978) Red Gold: The Conquest of the Brazilian Indians, London: Pan Macmillan
 (1981) Machu Picchu, New York: Newsweek Books
 (1982) Monuments of the Incas, with Edward Ranney, New York: New York Graphic Society
 (1987) Amazon Frontier, London: Pan Macmillan
 (1993) Maracá: Rainforest Island, London: Macmillan
 (1998) The Golden Age of Discovery, London: Pavilion Books
 (2003) Die if You Must, London: Pan Macmillan
 (2008) Tree of Rivers: The Story of the Amazon, London: Thames and Hudson
  (2015) ''  Naturalists in Paradise: Wallace, Bates and Spruce in the Amazon

References

External links
 John Hemming's website
 John Hemming letter from the Amazon The Sydney Morning Herald - Sep 10, 1961
 "John Hemming: the rainforest man", interview in The Daily Telegraph, 2008
 Lambert & Stamp documentary - Sony Classics
 Exploring the Amazon: 

1935 births
Living people
Canadian expatriates in the United Kingdom
Canadian explorers
Incan scholars
Fellows of the Royal Society of Literature
Writers from Vancouver
Writers from London
British non-fiction writers
Brazilianists
People educated at Eton College
Alumni of Magdalen College, Oxford
English male writers
McGill University alumni
Recipients of the President's Medal (British Academy)
Male non-fiction writers